John Morales is a meteorologist born in Schenectady, New York and raised in Puerto Rico.  He attended the meteorology program at Cornell University and was then hired by the National Weather Service in 1984.  In 1991, he was hired by the Spanish language television network Univision and founded his company Climadata Corporation. He has won three Emmy Awards: in 1993 for "48 Horas Antes de la Tormenta" (English: "48 Hours Before the Storm"); in 2005 for his coverage of Hurricane Wilma; and in 2010 for a special program about the upcoming hurricane season.

Morales has the Seal of Approval from both the American Meteorological Society (AMS) and the National Weather Association (NWA).  He was given the prestigious distinction of Certified Consulting Meteorologist from the AMS.  In 2003, he became Chief Meteorologist at WSCV in Miami. In May 2009, John made the switch to English language television, joining NBC O&O WTVJ in Miami.

References

Living people
Cornell University College of Agriculture and Life Sciences alumni
American television meteorologists
Scientists from Schenectady, New York
National Weather Service people
Year of birth missing (living people)